Silvio Meli (born 1954) is a Maltese judge. He is a graduate of the University of Malta. He has been president of the Commission for Fair Trading and the Commission Against Drug and Alcohol Abuse.

See also 

 Judiciary of Malta

References 

Living people
20th-century Maltese judges
21st-century Maltese judges
1954 births
University of Malta alumni
Date of birth missing (living people)